List of annelid families describes the taxa relationships in the phylum Annelida, which contains more than 17,000 extant species including ragworms, earthworms, and leeches.

Class Polychaeta

Palpata  
 Sub-class Errantia
Order Amphinomida 
 Family Amphinomidae  Savigny in Lamarck, 1818  
 Family Euphrosinidae   Williams, 1851 
Order Eunicida
 Family Dorvilleidae   Chamberlin, 1919  
 Family Eunicidae   Berthold, 1827 	 	 
 Family Hartmaniellidae   Imajima, 1977 	  
 Family Lumbrineridae   Schmarda, 1861 	 
 Family Oenonidae   Kinberg, 1865 	 
 Family Onuphidae  Kinberg, 1865 
Order Phyllodocida
 Family Acoetidae   Kinberg, 1856  	 
 Family Alciopidae   Ehlers, 1864  	 
 Family Aphroditidae   Malmgren, 1867  
 Family Chrysopetalidae   Ehlers, 1864  
 Family Eulepethidae   Chamberlin, 1919  	 
 Family Glyceridae   Grube, 1850  
 Family Goniadidae   Kinberg, 1866 
 Family Hesionidae   Grube, 1850  	 
 Family Ichthyotomidae   Eisig, 1906  	 
 Family Iospilidae   Bergstroem, 1914  	 
 Family Lacydoniidae  Bergstroem, 1914  	 
 Family Lopadorhynchidae   Claparede, 1868  	 
 Family Myzostomidae   Benham, 1896  	 
 Family Nautiliniellidae   Miura and Laubier, 1990  	 
 Family Nephtyidae   Grube, 1850  	 
 Family Nereididae   Johnston, 1865 	 
 Family Paralacydoniidae   Pettibone, 1963  	 
 Family Pholoidae   Kinberg, 1858  
 Family Phyllodocidae   Oersted, 1843  	 
 Family Pilargidae   Saint-Joseph, 1899  	 
 Family Pisionidae   Southern, 1914  	 
 Family Polynoidae   Malmgren, 1867  	 
 Family Pontodoridae   Bergstroem, 1914  	 
 Family Sigalionidae   Malmgren, 1867  	 
 Family Sphaerodoridae   Malmgren, 1867  	 
 Family Syllidae   Grube, 1850  	 
 Family Tomopteridae   Johnston, 1865  	 
 Family Typhloscolecidae  Uljanin, 1878  
Incertae sedis
 Family Aberrantidae  Wolf, 1987   
 Family Nerillidae  Levinsen, 1883  	 
 Family Spintheridae  Johnston, 1865   
 Canalipalpata

Scolecida

 Family Aeolosomatidae
 Family Arenicolidae
 Family Capitellidae
 Family Cossuridae
 Family Maldanidae
 Family Opheliidae
 Family Orbiniidae
 Family Paraonidae
 Family Parergodrilidae
 Family Potamodrilidae
 Family Psammodrilidae
 Family Questidae
 Family Scalibregmatidae

Echiura 

 Order Echiuroidea
 Suborder Bonelliida
 Family Bonelliidae
 Family Ikedidae
 Suborder Echiurida
 Family Echiuridae
 Family Thalassematidae
 Family Urechidae

Class Clitellata 

 Order Branchiobdellida
 Subclass Hirudinea (Leech)
 Infraclass Acanthobdellidea
 Infraclass Euhirudinea
 Order Arhynchobdellida
 Suborder Erpobdelliformes
Family Erpobdellidae Blanchard, 1894
Family Gastrostomobdellidae Richardson, 1971
Family Orobdellidae Nakano, Ramlah & Hikida, 2012
Family Salifidae Johansson, 1910
 Suborder Hirudiniformes
Family Cylicobdellidae
Family Haemadipsidae
Family Haemopidae
Family Hirudinidae
Family Semiscolecidae
Family Xerobdellidae
 Order Rhynchobdellida
Family Glossiphoniidae
Family Ozobranchidae (disputed)
Family Piscicolidae

Class Machaeridia †
 Family †Plumulitidae
 Family †Turrilepadidae
 Family †Lepidocoleidae

Subphylum Sipuncula  
 Class Phascolosomatidea
 Order Aspidosiphoniformes
 Family Aspidosiphonidae
 Order Phascolosomatiformes
 Family Phascolosomatidae
 Class Sipunculidea
 Order Golfingiiformes
 Family Golfingiidae
 Family Phascolionidae
 Family Themistidae
 Order Sipunculiformes
 Family Sipunculidae

References

 List of
Annelid